= Simon On =

Simon On Chun-ho
- 安俊豪
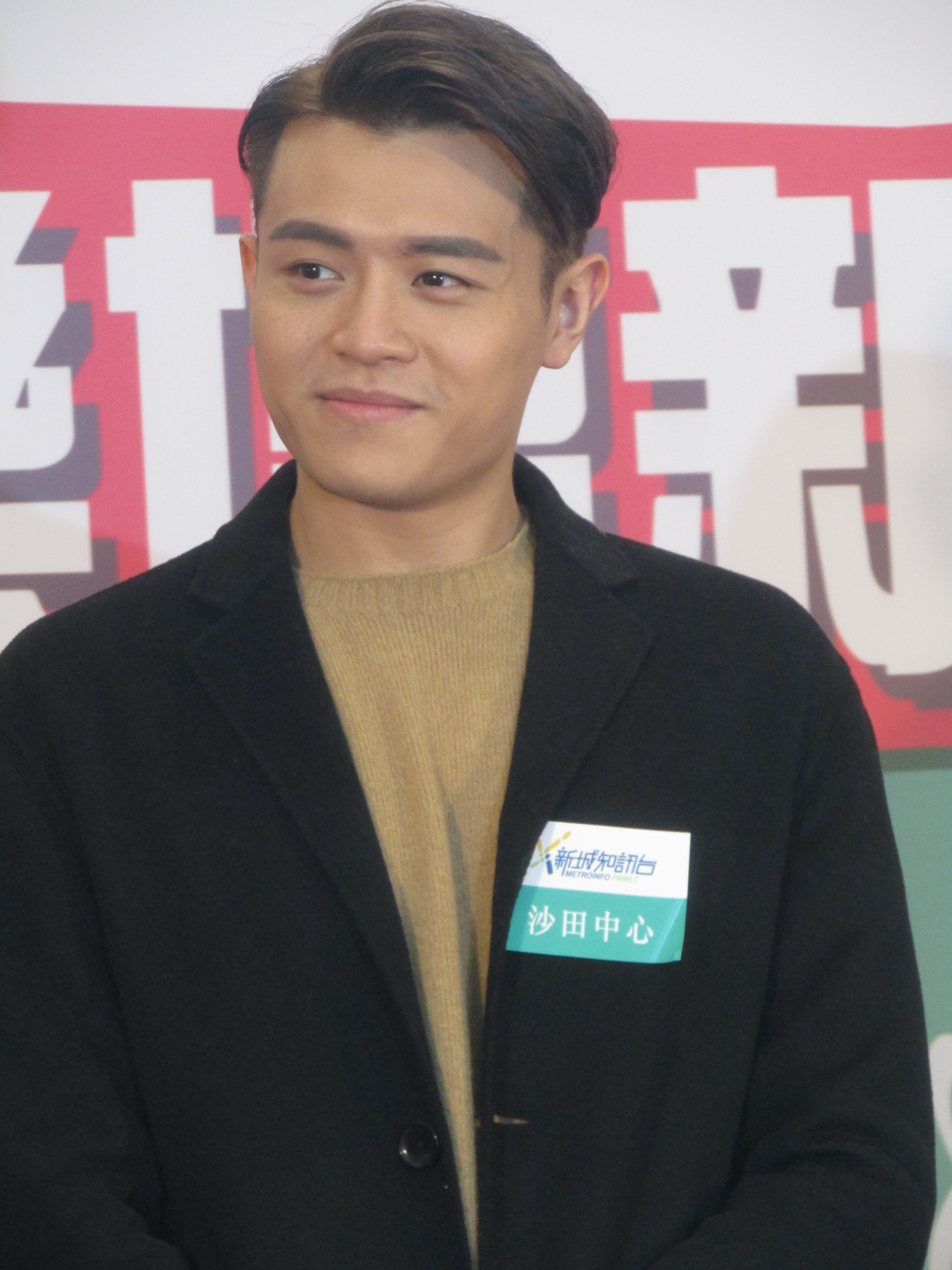
- Born: Lee Chi-ho
- Occupations: Singer, actor, fitness instructor
- Years active: 2009–present

Simon On Chun-ho (Chinese: 安俊豪), originally known as Lee Chi-ho, is a Hong Kong male singer and actor.

== Background ==
Simon On is of mixed Chinese and Thai descent and is fluent in Thai. When he was growing up, his mother operated a restaurant. He participated in the first season of "Asian Millionstar" in 2009.

On November 5, 2022, Simon On held his first solo concert, "Simon On SINS Concert", at the Music Zone of the Kowloon Bay International Trade & Exhibition Centre, inviting singers Shiga Lin and Lee Yin as special On December 29, 2022, he won the "Most Promising Singer Award" at the Metro Radio Hit Awards.

On is also a fitness instructor.
